Hylacola is a genus of bird in the family Acanthizidae.

It contains the following species, both of which are endemic to Australia:
 Shy heathwren (Hylacola cauta)
 Chestnut-rumped heathwren (Hylacola pyrrhopygia)

References

 Del Hoyo, J.; Elliot, A. & Christie D. (editors). (2006). Handbook of the Birds of the World. Volume 12: Picathartes to Tits and Chickadees. Lynx Edicions. 

 
Bird genera
Taxonomy articles created by Polbot